Karczemka may refer to the following places:
Karczemka, Greater Poland Voivodeship (west-central Poland)
Karczemka, Bydgoszcz County in Kuyavian-Pomeranian Voivodeship (north-central Poland)
Karczemka, Lubusz Voivodeship (west Poland)
Karczemka, Warmian-Masurian Voivodeship (north Poland)